The two Explorer-class submarines were experimental vessels built for the Royal Navy to test a propulsion system based on the use of highly concentrated hydrogen peroxide (high-test peroxide, HTP) and diesel fuel to achieve high underwater endurance and speeds.

Germany had started experimenting with this technology early in the Second World War and developed it into the Walter cycle. They had built some experimental boats.

This eventually led to the construction of the two Explorer-class experimental vessels, which used steam turbines, the steam being generated using heat from the catalysed interaction of HTP and diesel oil. They used the Porpoise-class hull, modified with retractable superstructure fittings to help streamlining. Being purely experimental craft they had no torpedo tubes or radar fitted, only one periscope and were equipped with backup diesel engines to recharge the batteries and propel them on the surface.

The first, Excalibur, was commissioned in March 1958. Because of the use of hydrogen peroxide as a hair bleach, the submarines were nicknamed the Blonde class. As well as providing experience with this type of technology, they also allowed the Royal Navy to practise against fast moving underwater targets. However the use of HTP was not successful, and there were several explosions, which resulted in the second nickname of Exploder being applied to the class and Explorer in particular, while Excalibur had the nickname "Excruciater".

When the United States developed a nuclear reactor which could be installed in a submarine, the HTP project was abandoned.  It was decided that it was not worth converting the class into normal diesel submarines. As a result, Explorer was sold for £13,500 to Thos. W. Ward for breaking up; Excalibur in turn was also subsequently sold to Thos. W. Ward.

Other countries have since developed the concept of the non-nuclear air-independent propulsion submarine to the point where it is a safe technology albeit as an auxiliary power source to a conventional diesel-electric drive, although hydrogen peroxide has long been abandoned and liquid oxygen is generally now preferred.

Boats

References

Further reading
 
 

Submarine classes